The Prince of Novgorod (knyaz novgorodskii) was the chief executive of the Republic of Novgorod.  The office was originally an appointed one until the late eleventh or early twelfth century, then became something of an elective one until the fourteenth century, after which the Prince of Vladimir (who was almost always the Prince of Moscow) was almost invariably the Prince of Novgorod as well.

The office began sometime in the ninth century when, according to tradition, the Viking (Varangian) chieftain Rurik and his brothers were invited to rule over the Eastern Slavs,  but real reliable information on the office dates only to the late tenth century when Vladimir the Great was prince of Novgorod.  The office or title technically continued up until the abdication of Nicholas II in 1917 – among his titles (although his list of titles was rarely given in complete form) was Prince of Novgorod the Great.

After the chief Rurikid prince moved to Kiev in the late ninth century, he usually sent either his son or a posadnik (mayor), to rule on his behalf.  Thus Sviatoslav I sent his son Vladimir the Great to rule in Novgorod, and after Vladimir became Grand Prince of Kiev, he sent his son, Yaroslav the Wise to reign in Novgorod.

Republican period
From the early twelfth century to 1478, the prince's power in the Republic of Novgorod was more nominal.  Imperial and Soviet-era scholars often argued that the office was ineffectual after 1136, when Prince Vsevolod Mstislavich was dismissed by the Novgorodians, and that Novgorod could invite and dismiss its princes at will.  In this way, the prince of Novgorod was no longer "ruler" of Novgorod but became an elective or appointed executive official of the city-state.

That being said, the traditional view of the prince being invited in or dismissed at will is an oversimplification of a long and complex history of the office.  In fact, from the late tenth century to the fall of Novgorod in 1478, the princes of Novgorod were dismissed and invited only about half the time, and the vast majority of these cases occurred between 1095 and 1293, and not consistently so during that period.  That is, the office was elective for perhaps two centuries and even then it was not always elective.  Even during this period, the nadir of princely power in the city, more powerful princes could assert their power independently over the city, as did Mstislav the Bold in the early 13th century, Alexander Nevsky in the 1240s and 50s, his brother Iaroslav in the 1260s and 70s, and others.

According to a remark in the chronicles, Novgorod had the right, after 1196, to pick their prince of their own free will, but again, the evidence indicates that even after that, princes were chosen and dismissed only about half the time, and Novgorod often chose the most powerful prince in Rus' as their prince. That usually meant that the prince in Kiev, Vladimir or Moscow (who retained the title Grand Prince of Vladimir from about the 1320s onward, although there were several interruptions), either took the title himself or appointed his son or other relative to be prince of Novgorod.  At times other princes, from Tver, Grand Duchy of Lithuania, and elsewhere, also vied for the Novgorodian throne.  Thus Novgorod did not really choose its prince, but considering the political climate, they often very prudently went with the most senior or most powerful prince in the land if he did not impose himself (or his candidate) upon them.

What was different about Novgorod, then, was not so much that Novgorod could freely choose its princes - it really couldn't.  Rather, what was unique was that no princely dynasty managed to establish itself within the city and take permanent control over the city.  Rather, while other Rus' cities had established dynasties, the more powerful princes vied for control of Novgorod the Great, a most-desirable city to control given the vast wealth (from trade in furs) that flowed into the city in the medieval period.

In the absence of firmer princely control the local elites, the boyars, took control of the city and the offices of posadnik and tysyatsky became elective. The veche (public assembly) played a not insignificant role in public life, although the precise makeup of the veche and its powers is uncertain and still contested among historians.  The posadnik, tysiatsky, and even the local bishop or archbishop (after 1165) were elected at the veche, and it is said the veche invited and dismissed the prince as well.

List of princes

 Burivoi (legendary Slovene ruler)
 Gostomysl (legendary Slovene ruler)

House of Rurik

Part of Kievan Rus'

Feudal Period

(Note: as the seat of this principality was elective (non-hereditary, the princes will be presented with their patronymic)

Princes of Moscow

 1328-1337 Ivan I Kalita the Money-bag 
 1337-1353 Simeon the Proud
 1353-1359 Ivan II the Fair
 1359-1363 Dmitry II the One-eyed, 1359–1363
 1363-1389 Dmitry III of the Don

Gediminids

 1389-1407 Lengvenis

House of Rurik

 1408-1425 Vasily III, 1408–1425
 1425-1462 Vasily II the Blind, 1425–1462
 1462-1480 Ivan III the Great

References

Further reading
 Bibliography of the history of the Early Slavs and Rus'
 Bibliography of Russian history (1223–1613)
 List of Slavic studies journals

External links
 Минникес И.В.Основания и порядок избрания князя в русском государстве Х-XIV вв.\АКАДЕМИЧЕСКИЙ ЮРИДИЧЕСКИЙ ЖУРНАЛ №4(6)(октябрь-декабрь) 2001 г.\\Иркутское ГНИУ Институт Законодательства и правовой информации

 
Novgorod Republic
Novgorod, Prince of
Novgorod, Prince of